The 2013 ADAC GT Masters season was the seventh season of the ADAC GT Masters, the grand tourer-style sports car racing founded by the German automobile club ADAC. It began on 27 April at Motorsport Arena Oschersleben and finished on 29 September at Hockenheim after eight double-header meetings. Diego Alessi and Daniel Keilwitz claimed the championship title.

Entry list

Race calendar and results

Standings

References

External links
 
 ADAC GT Masters on RacingSportCars
 2013 ADAC GT Masters season on Speedsport Magazine

ADAC GT Masters season
ADAC GT Masters seasons